Puguang Temple or Puguang Chan Temple is a Buddhist temple located in Yongding District of Zhangjiajie, Hunan, China.

History
According to Hunan Yongding Records, the temple was first built by a military official Yong Jian in 1413, under the Ming dynasty (1368–1644).

In 1733, in the reign of Yongzheng Emperor in the Qing dynasty (1644–1911), a local official named Shi Cheng renovated and refurbished the temple.

Architecture
The extant structure is based on the Ming and Qing dynasties building principles and retains the traditional architectural style. The complex include the following halls: Shanmen, Mahavira Hall, Hall of Four Heavenly Kings, Hall of Guanyin, Bell tower, Drum tower, Hall of Arhats, Dharma Hall, Dining Room, etc.

Shanmen
Statues of Heng and Ha sitting on the seats before both sides of the Shanmen.

Mahavira Hall
Under the eaves is a plaque with the Chinese characters "Mahavira Hall" written by former Venerable Master of the Buddhist Association of China Zhao Puchu. It went through more than 10 rebuilds. The latest maintenance was in 1989. The Mahavira Hall enshrining the statues of Guanyin, Manjushri and Samantabhadra.

Hall of Arhats
The Hall of Arhats houses statues of lifelike Eighteen Arhats with different looks and manners.

Hall of Guanyin
A statue of Guanyin is enshrined in the Hall of Guanyin.

Gallery

References

Bibliography
 

Buddhist temples in Hunan
Buildings and structures in Zhangjiajie
Tourist attractions in Zhangjiajie
1733 establishments in China
18th-century Buddhist temples
Religious buildings and structures completed in 1733